Martin Moller (10 November 1547 – 2 March 1606) was a German poet and mystic.

Life 
Moller was born in Ließnitz (now Kropstädt bei Wittenberg, Saxony-Anhalt) in 1547 and became cantor in Löwenberg  in Lower Silesia in 1568. He was ordained in 1572, despite never having been to university, and served as priest and deacon in Kesseldorf, Löwenberg and Sprottau. He came to Görlitz in 1600, where Jakob Böhme was in his congregation. Böhme was a keen attendant at the devotional meetings Moller held at his house; only after Moller's death at Görlitz in 1606 did Böhme start coming into conflict with the Görlitz priesthood.

Works 
Moller's works characterise him as a conciliatory theologian rather than one who, like Böhme, looked to provoke conflict. Practical Christianity, not dogma, was important to him. As such, he can be regarded as a forerunner of Johann Arndt.

He was suspected of Crypto-Calvinist sympathies after publishing his Praxis evangeliorum in 1601 and did little to refute these claims. Other well-known works of devotional literature written by Moller include Meditationes Sanctorum Patrum (1584–1591), Soliloquia de passione Jesu Christi (1587) and Mysterium magnum (1597). All of these works show clearly how Moller was influenced by another German theologian with links to mysticism, Valerius Herberger.

He also wrote several hymns, four of which survive in today's German Protestant hymnals. He is, however, of greater importance as a source for other hymn-writers. His Meditationes Sanctorum Patrum, a bipartite collection of prayers purportedly based on writings of Augustine, Bernard of Clairvaux and Anselm of Canterbury (though actually these texts were probably pseudo-Augustinian and -Bernardian, written much later in the style of the Church Fathers), provided Johann Heermann with a basis for many of the hymns in his Devoti musica cordis.

Johann Sebastian Bach wrote two chorale cantatas on hymns by Moller or attributed to him, Nimm von uns, Herr, du treuer Gott, BWV 101, and Ach Gott, wie manches Herzeleid, BWV 3.

References 
 Elke Axmacher: Praxis Evangeliorum: Theologie und Frömmigkeit bei Martin Moller (1547–1606). (Forschungen zur Kirchen- und Dogmengeschichte, 43), Berlin: Kirchliche Hochschule, 1986; Göttingen 1989.
 Carl Hitzeroth, Johann Heermann (1585–1647): Ein Beitrag der Geschichte der geistlichen Lyrik im siebzehnten Jahrhundert, Marburg: Elwert, 1907
 Carl-Alred Zell, Untersuchungen zum Problem der geistlichen Barocklyrik mit besonderer Berücksichtigung der Dichtung Johann Heermanns (1585–1647), Heidelberg: Carl Winter Universitätsverlag, 1971

External links 

 Jacob Boehme Online: Moller's influence on Boehme

1547 births
1606 deaths
16th-century German poets
16th-century German male writers
16th-century Lutherans
16th-century Christian mystics
German Lutherans
German Lutheran hymnwriters
Protestant mystics
German male poets
People from Wittenberg
16th-century male writers
Early modern Christian devotional writers
16th-century Lutheran theologians
17th-century Lutheran theologians